M27 is a Ukrainian international highway (M-highway) in southern Ukraine that runs from Odesa to Chornomorsk along the coast of Black Sea. Until 1 January 2013, it was designated as H04.

Main route

Main route and connections to/intersections with other highways in Ukraine.

See also

 Roads in Ukraine
 Ukraine Highways

References

External links

Roads in Odesa Oblast
Roads in Ukraine